The Speyside distillery is a Scotch whisky distillery near the hamlet of Drumguish in the Speyside region of Scotland, close to the village of Kingussie. 
It currently produces the SPEY single malt, BEINN DUBH Single malt and BYRON'S Hand crafted gin

Facility
The distillery was originally founded from an old Barley Mill built in the 1760s. Purchased in 1962 by George Christie it was built by hand by George Christie and a stone mason Alex Fairlie over the next 2 decades, and was finished in 1987. It took another three years until whisky production started in 1990.

Two copper pot stills of traditional shape were installed. Because massive production was never one of George's objectives, they are still some of the smallest in Scotland. The Glenspey mash tun was the last fitted by Newmill engineering before they closed down. Though small the distillery can produce 600,000 litres of alcohol per annum. The distillery is the second most southern whisky distillery in Speyside and takes its water directly from the River Tromie.

Products
Harvey's of Edinburgh, established 1770, are the new owners of The Speyside distillery company since 2012. 
Today's production are Single Malts SPEY, BEINN DUBH and BYRON'S GIN. 
These include SPEY Single Malts: Tenne, Trutina, Fumare, Chairman's Choice and Royal Choice; Beinn Dubh Single Malt in the core collection.
Limited Editions recently included SPEY 10 year old, SPEY 18 year old, Cask Strength SPEY Tenne, SPEY Trutina and SPEY Fumare and the recent addition of The SPEY 12 year old.

Historically the Christie family had produced Drumguish, Speyside & Glentromie with bottlings under other names including the blends Glen Hood, Scottish Prince plus cast strength single malts under the name Scotts Selection.

See also
 Whisky
 Scotch whisky
 List of whisky brands
 List of distilleries in Scotland

References

Distilleries in Scotland
Scottish malt whisky
Companies based in Highland (council area)